Us is a 2019 American psychological horror film written and directed by Jordan Peele, starring Lupita Nyong'o, Winston Duke, Elisabeth Moss, and Tim Heidecker. The film follows Adelaide Wilson (Nyong'o) and her family, who are attacked by a group of menacing doppelgängers.

The project was announced in February 2018, and much of the cast joined in the following months. Peele produced the film alongside Jason Blum and Sean McKittrick (the trio previously having collaborated on Get Out and BlacKkKlansman), as well as Ian Cooper. Filming took place in California, mostly in Los Angeles, Pasadena and Santa Cruz, from July to October 2018.

Us premiered at South by Southwest on March 8, 2019, and was theatrically released in the United States on March 22, 2019, by Universal Pictures. It was a critical and commercial success, grossing $256 million worldwide against a budget of $20 million, and received praise for Peele's screenplay and direction, Nyong'o's performance, and Michael Abels's musical score.

Plot
In 1986, a young girl named Adelaide “Addy” Thomas watches a commercial for Hands Across America. One night at the Santa Cruz Beach Boardwalk, she wanders away from her parents and enters a funhouse, where she encounters a doppelgänger of herself in the house of mirrors. Following the encounter she stops speaking and withdraws from her family.

Years later, an adult Adelaide goes on vacation with her husband, Gabriel "Gabe" Wilson, and their children Zora and Jason. She is apprehensive about the trip, but despite her misgivings, the family meet with their friends Josh and Kitty Tyler and their twin daughters Becca and Lindsey at the beach. On the way there, they witness paramedics taking away the bloody body of an old man holding a sign identical to one she saw on the day of the doppelgänger encounter. Jason later sees someone strangely similar to the old man, standing still with his arms outstretched and hands bloody.

That night, Adelaide tells Gabe about her childhood experience, but she is interrupted when the lights go out. Jason notices a 'family' of four in the driveway, who soon gain entry into the house. Cornering the Wilsons in their own living room, Jason recognizes the intruders as the Wilsons' doppelgängers. They include Pluto (Jason's pyromaniac, facially scarred double), Umbrae (Zora's sadistic double), and Abraham (Gabe's animalistic double). They are led by Red (Adelaide's double), the only one who can speak, albeit in a guttural and raspy voice. Red explains that they are called "the Tethered” as they share a soul with their lookalike counterparts, and they have come to "untether" themselves. The Wilsons are separated and terrorized by their doppelgängers. Jason discovers that Pluto mirrors his actions. After Gabriel kills Abraham, the family escapes.

Meanwhile, the Tyler family is assaulted at home and murdered by their own doppelgängers. The Wilsons arrive and are assaulted as well, but they manage to overpower and kill the Tylers' doubles. They turn on the news and learn that the Tethered have been murdering their equivalents across the city and, after doing so, joining hands to form a massive human chain; surrounding the city so no one can go in or out. The Wilsons decide to drive along the coast and escape to Mexico. While they are leaving, Umbrae attacks the car, and is killed by Zora.

Arriving at the boardwalk, the Wilsons find the townspeople already slaughtered. The road is blocked by a burning car. Jason, realizing it is a trap set by Pluto, orders everyone out of the car. Before Pluto can ignite the family's car, Jason moves, so that when Pluto mirrors him, Pluto walks into the burning car. While the Wilsons are distracted by Pluto burning to death, Red appears and snatches Jason away. Adelaide chases after Red to the funhouse where it all began. She finds a secret entrance that leads to an underground facility overrun by white rabbits, and she finds Red in a classroom.

Red tells Adelaide that "the Tethered" are actually genetic clones created by the government to control the originals on the surface. When the experiment failed, the Tethered were abandoned underground for generations, mindlessly mimicking the actions of their counterparts and surviving on rabbit meat. After they realized that Red was "different from the others", she spent years organizing them to escape and take vengeance by murdering their counterparts. Red and Adelaide begin to fight, with Red evading and countering all of Adelaide's attacks. When Adelaide allows Red to attack, she impales Red with a fireplace poker, then strangles her to death and breaks her neck. She rescues Jason from a locker, and Jason also rescues one of the rabbits.

While Adelaide drives the family away in the ambulance, she thinks back to the night she first met Red in that hall of mirrors. She remembers that the clone had choked Adelaide unconscious (damaging her larynx, making her voice raspy and guttural-sounding), dragged her underground, handcuffed her there, and returned above ground to usurp Adelaide's place in her life, eventually learning to speak and adjusting to living as a human being—she is the Tethered clone, and Red was the original Adelaide. Jason looks at his mother, who smiles at him.

The Tethered have formed a human chain, replicating the Hands Across America demonstration, stretching out of Santa Cruz and to nearby cities as helicopters hover overhead.

Cast

Production

Development

After being dismayed with the "genre confusion" over his previous film, Get Out, Peele opted to make his next film a "full-on" horror film. Peele has said that an inspiration for Us was The Twilight Zone episode "Mirror Image", which was centered on a young woman and her evil doppelgänger.

Peele has also said that the idea of the "tethered" living underground came to him as a teenager when he would take the train home from work.

"You get out of the train and you have to go down through an underpass and come out the other side. There's no one else there, just this dark, American town. I'd come up and I'd look over to the other side, and I'd picture seeing the tail end of myself going down that same tunnel, to presumably emerge right near me 30 seconds later. And I can't be seen by that other version of me...It was a very scary day as I saw my double but I instantly knew it wasn't real and the idea popped into my head."

Casting
On May 8, 2018, it was announced that Lupita Nyong'o, Winston Duke and Elisabeth Moss were all in negotiations to star in the film, with Nyong'o and Duke portraying a black couple, and Moss portraying one half of a white couple. Nyong'o later confirmed her casting by posting the film's promotional poster on her Instagram. The rest of the cast, including Tim Heidecker, Yahya Abdul-Mateen II, Shahadi Wright Joseph and Evan Alex were all confirmed in July of that year.

Peele saw the characters of the film as an "archetypal foursome", with Adelaide being the leader, Zora being the warrior, Gabe being jester/fool and Jason being the wiz/magician. For her role, Nyong'o had to use a different voice for the character of Red. She said her performance was inspired by the condition spasmodic dysphonia, a condition that causes a person's voice to go into periods of spasm. In order to perfect her voice, she "worked with an ear, nose, and throat doctor, a vocal therapist, and my dialect coach to try and make sure I could do it and do it safely. 'Cause I had two roles to play, I couldn't afford to damage my voice."

Filming

Principal photography began on July 30, 2018, in Santa Cruz, California, including their famous Boardwalk. Most of the film was shot in Los Angeles, and the main house featured is located in Pasadena. The house had modifications and the team spent six weeks there. Filming wrapped on October 8, 2018.

Post-production
The visual effects were provided by Industrial Light & Magic and supervised by Grady Cofer.

Michael Abels, who had previously scored Peele's Get Out, returned to do the same for Us.

Soundtrack
The 1995 Luniz song "I Got 5 on It" is featured in this film, first at the beginning, when the family is driving to the beach and then later on in the film when the "tethered" family breaks into the vacation home. The once-fun song transmogrifies into an eerie "Tethered Mix", slowing everything down, and fully indulging the ominous quality of the film. Due to the track's popularity upon the trailer's release, it was edited into the final cut of the film, appearing during the climax. Waxwork Records announced in August 2019 that they would release the soundtrack to the film on vinyl, which contained Abels's popular score. The N.W.A song "Fuck tha Police" is also heard when Kitty Tyler tells the voice assistant Ophelia to "call the police", moments before she is killed by her Tethered counterpart, Dahlia, and the song plays throughout when the Wilsons enter the Tyler family's home. The ending features the Minnie Riperton song "Les Fleurs".

Marketing
The official trailer was released on December 25, 2018. The trailer, which was set to a darker version of the song "I Got 5 on It", featured a similar tone, editing, and shots as Peele's Get Out, prompting speculation that the two films were set in the same universe.

A second trailer was released on February 3, 2019, for Super Bowl LIII. That trailer featured a narration by Lupita Nyong'o's character, Adelaide, speaking with her husband Gabriel about the strange coincidences happening since they arrived at their beach house, and describing it as a "black cloud" hanging over them. The new theatrical release date, March 22, was announced at the end of the trailer. Deadline Hollywood estimated the studio spent around $77 million on promotion and advertisements for the film.

Release
Us had its world premiere at the South by Southwest film festival (SXSW) on March 8, 2019. It was also screened on March 6, 2019, before its official release, at Howard University. The film was originally scheduled for theatrical release in the United States on March 15, 2019, but was pushed back a week to March 22, following the announcement of its SXSW premiere.

Home media
Us was released on 4K UHD Blu-ray, Blu-ray and DVD on June 18, 2019. The 4K release is an upscale from the 2K master.

Reception

Box office
Us grossed $175.1 million in the United States and Canada, and $80.1 million in other territories, for a worldwide total of $255.2 million, against a production budget of $20 million. Deadline Hollywood calculated the net profit of the film to be $119million, when factoring together all expenses and revenues.

In the United States and Canada, initial tracking had Us grossing $35–40million in its opening weekend. By the week of its release, estimates had risen to $45–50million, with advance ticket sales on Fandango outpacing A Quiet Place ($50.2 million) and Get Out ($33.7 million). The film made $29.1 million on its first day, including $7.4 million from Thursday night previews, one of the best-ever for a horror film and far higher than the Thursday night preview numbers for Get Out, which only grossed $1.8 million, increasing weekend estimates for Us to $68 million. It went on to earn $71.1 million at the box office, debuting at number one  and becoming the second best opening for a live-action original film after Avatar ($77 million in 2009), as well as the third-best total for a horror film after It ($123.4 million in 2017) and Halloween ($76.2 million in 2018) and the best ever opening for an original horror film not based on a known property. In its second weekend, the film made $33.6 million, dropping 52.7% (slightly above-average for a horror film but much larger than the 15% seen by Get Out) and finishing second behind newcomer Dumbo.

Critical response

 The website's critical consensus reads, "With Jordan Peele's second inventive, ambitious horror film, we have seen how to beat the sophomore jinx, and it is Us." On Metacritic, the film has a weighted average score of 81 out of 100, based on 56 critics, indicating "universal acclaim". Audiences polled by CinemaScore gave the film an average grade of "B" on an A+ to F scale, while those at PostTrak gave it an overall positive score of 80%, with 60% saying they would definitely recommend it. Us was described by Rolling Stone as "spill-your-soda scary", compared to the "existentially terrifying" Get Out.

Monica Castillo of RogerEbert.com gave the film four out of four, writing that: "Us is another thrilling exploration of the past and oppression this country is still too afraid to bring up. Peele wants us to talk, and he's given audiences the material to think, to feel our way through some of the darker sides of the human condition and the American experience." David Griffin of IGN gave the film 9.0/10, calling it "a very, very strange film. But that's OK because it wouldn't be a Jordan Peele joint if there wasn't a little risk involved. Peele has proven that he's not a one-hit wonder with this truly terrifying, poignant look at one American family that goes through hell at the hands of maniacal doppelgangers". John DeFore of The Hollywood Reporter called Us "a fiercely scary movie whose meaning is up for grabs".

Richard Brody of The New Yorker called the film a "colossal achievement," writing, "Us is a horror film—though saying so is like offering a reminder that The Godfather is a gangster film or that 2001: A Space Odyssey is science fiction. Genre is irrelevant to the merits of a film, whether its conventions are followed or defied; what matters is that Peele cites the tropes and precedents of horror in order to deeply root his film in the terrain of pop culture—and then to pull up those roots."

Conversely, Stephanie Zacharek of Time thought Peele had too many ideas and not enough answers compared to Get Out and said, "Peele goes even deeper into the conflicted territory of class and race and privilege; he also ponders the traits that make us most human. But this time, he's got so many ideas he can barely corral them, let alone connect them. He overthinks himself into a corner, and we're stuck there with him."

Disability rights groups National Spasmodic Dysphonia Association and RespectAbility criticised Nyong'o for basing her performance on spasmodic dysphonia. She later apologised.

Themes and interpretations
Critic Jim Vejvoda related the Tethered to "urban legends" and "xenophobic paranoia about the Other", also writing they resembled the Morlocks in H. G. Wells's 1895 novel, The Time Machine. Journalist Noel Ransome viewed the film as being about "the effects of classism and marginalization", writing "the Tethered are effigies of this same situational classism. They're trapped—mentally and physically—and ignored". Joel Meares of Rotten Tomatoes also noted that the Tethered, referencing the "we're Americans" line, are representatives of the duality of American society, how some citizens can afford to live on top of the class system while others are stuck in poverty. He also noted the title Us could mean "U.S.", or United States.

Manohla Dargis of The New York Times notes that the Wilsons are "introduced with an aerial sweep of greenery" similar to the opening of Stanley Kubrick's The Shining, and sees that movie as the principal influence on Us. Describing Peele as a "true cinephile", she also identifies allusions to other films, including Jaws, A Nightmare on Elm Street, and The Goonies, as well as one scene suggesting an influence by the Austrian film director Michael Haneke's 1997 horror film Funny Games and subsequent U.S. remake.

The Tethered's red jump suits and single glove were an allusion to Michael Jackson along with the "Thriller" shirt seen on young Adelaide, and Peele has stated that Jackson was "the patron saint of duality". Peele referenced many other instances of 1980s culture, including allusions to The Lost Boys and Hands Across America, stating "Everything in this movie was deliberate, that is one thing I can guarantee you. Unless you didn't like something and that was a complete accident".

The film contains numerous references to Jeremiah 11:11, which reads: "Therefore thus saith the Lord: 'I will bring on them a disaster they cannot escape. Although they cry out to me, I will not listen to them'" (NIV). Critic Rosie Fletcher commented on the context, with Jeremiah warning Jerusalem was facing destruction due to false idols, and expressed the opinion that the film's characters also "worshiped the wrong things", such as Ophelia, the virtual assistant.

Peele later explained in the film's digital release special features that a central theme of the film is American privilege:

Accolades

Us was nominated for one Art Directors Guild, four Critics' Choice Movie Awards, one Make-Up Artists and Hair Stylists Guild, three MTV Movie & TV Awards, eight NAACP Image Awards, four People's Choice Awards, one Bram Stoker Award (won), seven Saturn Awards (winning one), one Screen Actors Guild Award, and one World Soundtrack Awards (won).

See also
 List of black films of the 2010s
 List of horror films of the 2010s
 Disability in horror films

References

External links

 
 
 

2019 films
2019 horror films
African-American horror films
African-American films
American action horror films
American supernatural horror films
2010s English-language films
Films about cloning
Films about cults
Films about families
Films about mass murder
Films about mind control
Films directed by Jordan Peele
Films produced by Jason Blum
Films produced by Jordan Peele
Films scored by Michael Abels
Films set in 1986
Films set in 2019
Films set on beaches
Films set in Santa Cruz County, California
Films shot in California
Films with screenplays by Jordan Peele
Home invasions in film
Blumhouse Productions films
Universal Pictures films
2010s American films